Ronald Edward Meisburg (July 28, 1947 – February 3, 2023) was an American labor lawyer. He served as a member of the National Labor Relations Board before becoming that agency's general counsel. He later joined Hunton Andrews Kurth as special counsel in their Washington, D.C. office.

References

1947 births
2023 deaths
Carson–Newman University alumni
National Labor Relations Board officials
People from Bowling Green, Kentucky
University of Louisville School of Law alumni